Zach Kittley (born August 14, 1991) is an American football coach who is currently the offensive coordinator and quarterbacks coach at Texas Tech University. He previously served in the same capacity at Western Kentucky University in 2021 and Houston Baptist University from 2018 to 2020.

Coaching career

Early career
Kittley initially committed to playing college basketball at Abilene Christian, walking on to the team in 2011, but opted to pursue a career coaching football and transferred to Texas Tech University. From there, Kittley got a position on the football team as a student assistant to Sonny Cumbie. He was later promoted to graduate assistant in 2015, where he was the program's assistant quarterbacks coach and worked closely with future NFL MVP Patrick Mahomes.

Houston Baptist
Kittley was hired as the offensive coordinator and quarterbacks coach at Houston Baptist in 2018. At Houston Baptist, he engineered a turnaround of an offense that ranked in the bottom half of the NCAA Division I FCS division prior to his arrival to one of the top passing offenses in the country behind an Air raid offense. While at HBU, Kittley was intimately involved with the development of another quarterback prospect in Bailey Zappe, who would play a critical role at his next coaching stop.

Western Kentucky
Kittley was named the offensive coordinator and quarterbacks coach at Western Kentucky on December 14, 2020. Zappe would follow Kittley to Western Kentucky. In Kittley's first year with Western Kentucky, the Hilltoppers offense improved from 115th in scoring among FBS teams in 2020 to 2nd in the FBS in scoring in 2021. During WKU's win in the 2021 Boca Raton Bowl, Zappe set new single-season FBS records for passing touchdowns and yardage.

Texas Tech
Kittley was named the offensive coordinator and quarterbacks coach at Texas Tech on December 5, 2021, joining head coach Joey McGuire in his first season.

Personal life
Kittley is the son of Wes Kittley, who has been the track and field coach at Texas Tech since 2000 and was previously the track and field coach at Abilene Christian. Kittley and his wife, Emily, have two sons.

References

External links
 
 Western Kentucky Hilltoppers profile

1991 births
Living people
Houston Christian Huskies football coaches
Texas Tech Red Raiders football coaches
Western Kentucky Hilltoppers football coaches
Sportspeople from Abilene, Texas
Sportspeople from Lubbock, Texas
Coaches of American football from Texas